Southern Min, Minnan or Banlam, is a group of linguistically similar and historically related Sinitic languages that form a branch of Min Chinese spoken in Fujian (especially the Minnan region), most of Taiwan (many citizens are descendants of settlers from Fujian), Eastern Guangdong, Hainan, and Southern Zhejiang. The Minnan dialects are also spoken by descendants of emigrants from these areas in diaspora, most notably in Southeast Asia, such as Singapore, Malaysia, the Philippines, Indonesia, Brunei, Southern Thailand, Myanmar, Cambodia, Southern and Central Vietnam, San Francisco, Los Angeles and New York City. It is the most populous branch of Min Chinese, spoken by an estimated 48 million people in c. 2017–2018.

In common parlance and in the narrower sense, Southern Min refers to the Quanzhang or Hokkien-Taiwanese variety of Southern Min originating from Southern Fujian in Mainland China. This is spoken mainly in Fujian, Taiwan, as well as certain parts of Southeast Asia. The Quanzhang variety is often called simply "Minnan Proper". It is considered the mainstream Southern Min Chinese language.

In the wider scope, Southern Min also includes other Min Chinese varieties that are linguistically related to Minnan proper (Quanzhang). Most variants of Southern Min have significant differences from the Quanzhang variety, some having limited mutual intelligibility with it, others almost none. Teochew, Longyan, and Zhenan are said to have general mutual intelligibility with Minnan Proper, sharing similar phonology and vocabulary to a large extent. On the other hand, variants such as Datian, Zhongshan, and Qiong-Lei have historical linguistic roots with Minnan Proper, but are significantly divergent from it in terms of phonology and vocabulary, and thus have almost no mutual intelligibility with the Quanzhang variety. Linguists tend to classify them as separate Min languages.

Southern Min is not mutually intelligible with other branches of Min Chinese nor with non-Min varieties of Chinese, such as Mandarin, and the principal varieties of Southern Min are not intelligible with each other.

Geographic distribution

Mainland China
Southern Min dialects are spoken in Fujian, three southeastern counties of Zhejiang, the Zhoushan archipelago off Ningbo in Zhejiang and the Chaoshan (Teo-swa) region in Guangdong. The variant spoken in Leizhou, Guangdong as well as Hainan is Hainanese and is not mutually intelligible with mainstream Southern Min or Teochew. Hainanese is classified in some schemes as part of Southern Min and in other schemes as separate. Puxian Min was originally based on the Quanzhou dialect, but over time became heavily influenced by Eastern Min, eventually losing intelligibility with Minnan.

Taiwan
The Southern Min dialects spoken in Taiwan, collectively known as Taiwanese, is a first language for most of the Hoklo people, the main ethnicity of Taiwan. The correspondence between language and ethnicity is not absolute, as some Hoklo have very limited proficiency in Southern Min while some non-Hoklo speak Southern Min fluently.

Southeast Asia
There are many Southern Min speakers among overseas Chinese in Southeast Asia. Many ethnic Chinese immigrants to the region were Hoklo from southern Fujian and brought the language to what is now present-day Malaysia and Singapore (formerly British Malaya, the Straits Settlements, and British Borneo), Indonesia (the former Dutch East Indies), the Philippines (former Spanish East Indies and later, US Philippine Islands (P.I.)), Brunei (former part of British Borneo), Southern Thailand, Myanmar (British Burma), Cambodia (former French Cambodia of French Indochina), Southern Vietnam (former French Cochinchina of French Indochina) and Central Vietnam (former French Annam of French Indochina). In general, Southern Min from southern Fujian is known as Hokkien, Hokkienese, Fukien or Fookien in Southeast Asia and is mostly mutually intelligible with Hokkien spoken elsewhere. Many Southeast Asian ethnic Chinese also originated in the Chaoshan region of Guangdong and speak Teochew language, the variant of Southern Min from that region, particularly Thailand, Cambodia, Southern Vietnam, Malaysia, Singapore, Indonesia, etc. In the Philippines, Philippine Hokkien is reportedly the native or heritage language of up to 98.7% of the Chinese Filipino community in the Philippines, among whom it itself is known in Hokkien .

Southern Min speakers form the majority of Chinese in Singapore, with Hokkien being the largest group and the second largest being Teochew. Despite the similarities, the two groups are rarely seen as part of the same "Minnan" Chinese subgroups.

Classification
The variants of Southern Min spoken in Zhejiang province are most akin to that spoken in Quanzhou. The variants spoken in Taiwan are similar to the three Fujian variants and are collectively known as Taiwanese.

Those Southern Min variants that are collectively known as "Hokkien" in Southeast Asia also originate from these variants. The variants of Southern Min in the Chaoshan region of eastern Guangdong province are collectively known as Teo-Swa or Chaoshan. Chaoshan Min is of great importance in the Southeast Asian Chinese diaspora, particularly in Malaysia, Thailand, Cambodia, Vietnam, Sumatra, and West Kalimantan. The Philippines variant is mostly from the Quanzhou area as most of their forefathers are from the aforementioned area.

The Southern Min language variant spoken around Shanwei and Haifeng differs markedly from Teochew and may represent a later migration from Zhangzhou. Linguistically, it lies between Teochew and Amoy. In southwestern Fujian, the local variants in Longyan and Zhangping form a separate division of Minnan on their own. Among ethnic Chinese inhabitants of Penang, Malaysia and Medan, Indonesia, a distinct form based on the Zhangzhou dialect has developed. In Penang, it is called Penang Hokkien while across the Malacca Strait in Medan, an almost identical variant is known as Medan Hokkien.

Varieties
There are two or three divisions of Southern Min, depending on the criteria for Leizhou and Hainanese inclusion : 
 Minnan Proper (Hokkien–Taiwanese) under the Quanzhang division
 Teochew under the Chaoshan division
 Leizhou and Hainanese dialects under the Qiong-Lei division.

More recently, Kwok (2018: 157) has classified the Southern Min dialects the Central and Southern branches grouped together, as well as a separate divergent Northern branch.

Southern Min
Northern
Cangnan
Quanzhou, Zihu, Lukang
Central-Southern
Central
Zhangzhou
Longyan, Datian
Southern
Guangdong
? Haifeng
Jieyang, Chaoyang
Hainan
Leizhou
Haikou

Quanzhang (Hokkien)

The group of mutually intelligible Quanzhang dialects, spoken around the areas of Xiamen, Quanzhou and Zhangzhou in Southern Fujian, collectively called Minnan Proper or Hokkien-Taiwanese, is the mainstream form of Southern Min. It is also the widely spoken non-official regional language in Taiwan. There are two types of standard Minnan. They are classified as Traditional Standard Minnan and Modern Standard Minnan. Traditional Standard Minnan is based on the Quanzhou dialect. It is the dialect used in Liyuan Opera and Nanying music. The modern standard forms of Minnan Proper are based on Amoy dialect, spoken in the city of Xiamen, and Taiwanese dialect, spoken around the city of Tainan in Taiwan. Both modern standard forms of Minnan are a combination of Quanzhou and Zhangzhou speech. Nowadays, Modern Standard Minnan is the dialect of Minnan that is popular in Minnan dialect television programming, radio programming and Minnan songs. Most Minnan language books and Minnan dictionaries are mostly based on the pronunciation of the Modern Standard Minnan. Taiwanese in northern Taiwan tends to be based on Quanzhou dialect, whereas the Taiwanese spoken in southern Taiwan tends to be based on Zhangzhou dialect. There are minor variations in pronunciation and vocabulary between Quanzhou and Zhangzhou speech. The grammar is basically the same. Additionally, in Taiwanese Minnan, extensive contact with the Japanese language has left a legacy of Japanese loanwords. This language is also spoken in Singapore (as Singaporean Hokkien), Malaysia (as Penang Hokkien and Southern Peninsular Malaysian Hokkien), and Indonesia (as Medan Hokkien and Riau Hokkien), all of which have English (Singaporean / Malaysian / Indonesian) and Malay (Malaysian or Indonesian) loanwords, whereas it is also spoken in the Philippines (as Philippine Hokkien), which instead has Spanish, Tagalog (Filipino), and English (Philippine) loanwords.

Chaoshan (Teo-Swa)

Teo-Swa or Chaoshan speech is a closely related variant of Minnan that includes the Teochew and Swatow dialects. It has limited mutual intelligibility with Quanzhang speech, though they share some cognates with each other. Chaoshan Min is significantly different from Quanzhang in both pronunciation and vocabulary.  It had its origins from the Proto-Putian dialect, a sub-dialect of Proto-Minnan, which is closely related to the Quanzhou dialect. As the Proto-Putian dialect speaking Chinese emigrants from Putian prefecture settled in the Chaoshan region, it later received influence from the Zhangzhou dialect. It follows the same grammar pattern as Minnan Proper. It is marginally understood by Minnan Proper speakers.

Phonology

Southern Min has one of the most diverse phonologies of Chinese varieties, with more consonants than Mandarin or Cantonese. Vowels, on the other hand, are more-or-less similar to those of Mandarin. In general, Southern Min dialects have five to six tones, and tone sandhi is extensive. There are minor variations within Hokkien, and the Teochew system differs somewhat more.

Writing systems

Both Hokkien and Chaoshan (Teochew and Shantou dialects) have romanized writing systems and also respective Chinese characters. In Mainland China, it is known as 閩南文 (Bân-lâm-bûn), while in Taiwan, it is known as 台文 (Tâi-bûn). The Han Chinese Characters are known in Mainland China and Taiwan as 漢字 (Hàn-jī / Hàn-lī). In Malaysia and Singapore, the Chinese characters are sometimes known as 唐儂字 / 唐人字 (Tn̂g-lâng-jī / Tn̂g-lâng-lī). In the Philippines, the Chinese characters are known as 咱儂字 / 咱人字 (Lán-nâng-dī) or 漢文字 (Hàm-bûn-dī).

History
The Min homeland of Fujian was opened to Han Chinese settlement by the defeat of the Minyue state by the armies of Emperor Wu of Han in 110 BC.  The area features rugged mountainous terrain, with short rivers that flow into the South China Sea.  Most subsequent migration from north to south China passed through the valleys of the Xiang and Gan rivers to the west, so that Min varieties have experienced less northern influence than other southern groups.  As a result, whereas most varieties of Chinese can be treated as derived from Middle Chinese, the language described by rhyme dictionaries such as the Qieyun (601 AD), Min varieties contain traces of older distinctions.  Linguists estimate that the oldest layers of Min dialects diverged from the rest of Chinese around the time of the Han dynasty.  However, significant waves of migration from the North China Plain occurred.  These include:

 The Uprising of the Five Barbarians during the Jin dynasty, particularly the Disaster of Yongjia in 311 AD, caused a tide of immigration to the south.
 In 669, Chen Zheng and his son Chen Yuanguang from Gushi County in Henan set up a regional administration in Fujian to suppress an insurrection by the She people.
 Wang Chao, also from Gushi, moved south to Fujian and was appointed its governor in 893, near the end of the Tang dynasty, and brought tens of thousands of troops from Henan.  In 909, following the fall of the Tang dynasty, his younger brother Wang Shenzhi founded the Min Kingdom, one of the Ten Kingdoms in the Five Dynasties and Ten Kingdoms period.

Jerry Norman identifies four main layers in the vocabulary of modern Min varieties:

 A non-Chinese substratum from the original languages of Minyue, which Norman and Mei Tsu-lin believe were Austroasiatic.
 The earliest Chinese layer, brought to Fujian by settlers from Zhejiang to the north during the Han dynasty.
 A layer from the Northern and Southern Dynasties period, which is largely consistent with the phonology of the Qieyun dictionary.
 A literary layer based on the koiné of Chang'an, the capital of the Tang dynasty.

Comparisons with Sino-Xenic character pronunciations

Minnan (or Hokkien) can trace its origins through the Tang Dynasty, and it also has roots from earlier periods. Minnan (Hokkien) people call themselves "Tang people", (pronounced as "" ) which is synonymous to "Chinese people".  Because of the widespread influence of the Tang culture during the great Tang dynasty, there are today still many Minnan pronunciations of words shared by the Sino-xenic pronunciations of Vietnamese, Korean and Japanese languages.

See also

 Chinese in Singapore
 Languages of China
 Languages of Taiwan
 Languages of Thailand
 Malaysian Chinese
 Protection of the Varieties of Chinese

Related languages
 Fuzhou dialect (Min Dong branch)
 Lan-nang (Philippine dialect of Minnan)
 Medan Hokkien (North-Sumatra, Indonesia dialect of Minnan)
 Penang Hokkien
 Singaporean Hokkien
 Southern Malaysia Hokkien
 Taiwanese Minnan

References

Further reading
 
 
 
  "Part V: Southern Min Grammar" (3 articles).

External links

 當代泉州音字彙, a dictionary of Quanzhou speech
 
 
 臺灣閩南語常用詞辭典, Dictionary of Frequently-Used Taiwan Minnan by the Ministry of Education, Republic of China (Taiwan).
 臺灣本土語言互譯及語音合成系統, Taiwanese-Hakka-Mandarin online conversion
 Voyager - Spacecraft - Golden Record - Greetings from Earth - Amoy The voyager clip says:  
 台語詞典 Taiwanese-English-Mandarin Dictionary
 "How to Forget Your Mother Tongue and Remember Your National Language" by Victor H. Mair, University of Pennsylvania
 ISO 639-3 Change Request Documentation: 2008-083, requesting to replace code nan (Minnan Chinese) with dzu (Chaozhou) and xim (Xiamen), rejected because it did not include codes to cover the rest of the group.
 ISO 639-3 Change Request Documentation: 2021-045, requesting to replace code nan with 11 new codes.
  – supporting documentation

 
Languages of China
Languages of Malaysia
Languages of Singapore
Languages of Taiwan
Languages of the Philippines